Over It may refer to:

 Over It (band), an American pop punk band
 Over It (album), a 2019 album by Summer Walker, or the title track
 Over It (EP), an EP by face to face
 "Over It" (Katharine McPhee song)
 "Over It", a song by Addictiv
 "Over It", a song by Anneliese van der Pol from the soundtrack of the 2004 film Stuck in the Suburbs
 "Over It", a song by Ashley Tisdale from Headstrong
 "Over It", a song by Dinosaur Jr. from Farm
 "Over It", a song by Macklemore from Gemini
 "Over It", a song by Jordan Pruitt from No Ordinary Girl
 "Over It", a song by Relient K from Forget and Not Slow Down
 "Over It", a song by Tiffany Affair

See also
 Get Over It (disambiguation)